Webb's First Deep Field is the first operational image taken by the James Webb Space Telescope. The deep-field photograph, which covers a tiny area of sky visible from the Southern Hemisphere, is centered on SMACS 0723, a galaxy cluster in the constellation of Volans. Thousands of galaxies are visible in the image, some as old as 13 billion years. The image is the highest-resolution image of the early universe ever taken. Captured by the telescope's Near-Infrared Camera (NIRCam), the image was revealed to the public by NASA on 11 July 2022.

Background 
The James Webb Space Telescope is a space telescope operated by NASA and designed primarily to conduct infrared astronomy. At L2, the gravitational pull of the Sun equals the gravitational pull of the Earth, and the Earth and Sun remain co-aligned (as seen from that point) even as the Earth orbits the sun.

Webb's First Deep Field was taken by the telescope's Near-Infrared Camera (NIRCam) and is a composite produced from images at different wavelengths, totalling 12.5 hours of exposure time.

SMACS 0723 is a galaxy cluster visible from Earth's Southern Hemisphere, and has often been examined by Hubble and other telescopes in search of the deep past.

Scientific results 
The image shows the galaxy cluster SMACS 0723 as it appeared 4.6 billion years ago, covering an area of sky with an angular size approximately equal to a grain of sand held at arm's length. Many of the objects in the image have undergone notable redshift due to the expansion of space over the extreme distance traveled by the light radiating from them. The redshifts of nearly 200 of these objects have been measured to date, with the highest redshift measured at 8.498. 

The combined mass of the galaxy cluster acts as a gravitational lens, magnifying and distorting the images of much more distant galaxies behind it. Webb's NIRCam brought the distant galaxies into sharp focus, revealing tiny, faint structures that had never been seen before, including star clusters and diffuse features.

Diffraction spikes in the photo 

The six bright and two fainter spikes around the point sources of light in the photo are an artifact created by the physical limitations of the telescope. The six bright spikes are a result of diffraction from the mirror's edges. The mirror is composed of 18 individual units, each having the shape of a regular hexagon. The hexagonal rim of the units that make up the telescope's large mirror give rise to the six spikes. Telescopes with circular mirrors/lenses don't have such spikes (in lieu of spikes, diffraction from circular rims creates a pattern of concentric rings called Airy discs).

The two additional spikes are a result of diffraction from the struts holding the telescope's secondary mirror in front of the main mirror. As shown in the figure on the right, diffraction from the three struts creates six spikes, but four of these are designed to co-align with the spikes created from the diffraction caused by the rim. This leaves the two faint horizontal spikes visible in the photo.

Significance 
Webb's First Deep Field is the first full false-color image from the JWST, and the highest-resolution infrared view of the universe yet captured. The image reveals thousands of galaxies in a tiny sliver of the universe, with Webb's sharp near-infrared view bringing out faint structures in extremely distant galaxies, offering the most detailed view of the early universe to date. Thousands of galaxies, which include the faintest objects ever observed in the infrared, have appeared in Webb's view for the first time.

It was first revealed to the public during an event on 11 July 2022 by U.S. President Joe Biden.

Comparison with the Hubble Space Telescope 
The following images are a comparison with the image taken by the Hubble Space Telescope and the image taken by Webb of the same galaxy cluster.

See also 
 List of deep fields

References 

James Webb Space Telescope
Physical cosmology
Sky regions
Astronomy image articles
2022 in science
2020s photographs
Color photographs
2022 works